Evige Asatro is the first full-length album by the Norwegian folk metal band Glittertind, released on May 27, 2004 through Karmageddon Media. Torbjørn Sandvik handles all instruments on this record.

The title "Eternal Asatru" was taken from the last part of the non-finished opera Olav Tryggvason composed by Edvard Grieg and written by Bjørnstjerne Bjørnson. The opera is about Olav Tryggvason's unsuccessful attempt to christianize Norway. Because the opera was never finished, it ends with the victory of the Norse religion over Christianity.

Skrymer from Finntroll did the artwork and band logo for this album.

Statement in 2009 re-release
In the beginning of the 2009 re-release album booklet, the following statement is made:

Track listing

References

Glittertind (band) albums
2004 albums
Karmageddon Media albums